Evelyn Henry Lintott (2 November 1883 – 1 July 1916) was an English footballer who joined the British Army and died during the First World War. He played as a half back for Plymouth Argyle and Queens Park Rangers in the Southern League, and Bradford City and Leeds City in the Football League. Lintott was capped seven times by the England national team after becoming a professional player, and he also made five appearances for the amateur side. He was killed in action on the first day on the Somme, the opening day of the Battle of Albert.

Life and career
Born in Godalming, and educated at the Royal Grammar School, Guildford, Lintott was Queens Park Rangers' first ever England international in 1908.

His first major club was Woking where he helped the club to win the East and West Surrey League and Surrey Charity Shield. He moved to Devon to study teaching at St Luke's College in Exeter, and signed with Southern League club Plymouth Argyle in 1906. He made two appearances for Argyle during the 1906–07 season and then settled in London, where he taught at Oldfield Road School in Willesden. He joined Queens Park Rangers in 1907, making his professional debut in the replay of the 1908 FA Charity Shield match. He played 31 Southern League games before moving to Football League side Bradford City in 1908. He finished his career at Leeds City. Lintott was a schoolmaster throughout his career. In 1908 his weight was 12 stone and height 5 ft 10 inches.

When World War I was declared in 1914, Lintott was one of the first players to sign up for army service and joined the West Yorkshire Regiment's 15th Battalion, known as the Leeds Pals. He was promoted to lieutenant and became the first professional footballer to hold a commission. He was killed in action on 1 July 1916, the first day on the Somme, which was the opening day of the Battle of Albert and the first phase of the British and French offensive that became known as the Battle of the Somme. Lintott lost his life along with more than 19,000 other men.

References

External links

Profile at englandfootballonline
QPR tribute
Bradford City tribute
Medal card

1883 births
1916 deaths
People from Godalming
Military personnel from Surrey
English footballers
England international footballers
England amateur international footballers
Association football wing halves
Woking F.C. players
Plymouth Argyle F.C. players
Queens Park Rangers F.C. players
Bradford City A.F.C. players
Leeds City F.C. players
Southern Football League players
English Football League players
West Yorkshire Regiment officers
British Army personnel of World War I
British military personnel killed in the Battle of the Somme
People educated at Royal Grammar School, Guildford
English Football League representative players